Phyllopezus heuteri is a species of gecko, a lizard in the family Phyllodactylidae. The species is endemic to Paraguay.

Geographic range
P. heuteri is found in Cordillera Department, Paraguay.

Etymology
The specific name, heuteri, is in honor of German biologist Horst Heuter.

Description

References

Further reading
Cacciali, Pier; Lotzkat, Sebastian; Gamble, Tony; Köhler, Gunther (2018). "Cryptic Diversity in the Neotropical Gecko Genus Phyllopezus Peters, 1878 (Reptilia: Squamata: Phyllodactylidae): A New Species from Paraguay". International Journal of Zoology 2018: "Article ID 3958237, 14 pages". (Phyllopezus heuteri, new species).

Phyllopezus
Reptiles of Paraguay
Reptiles described in 2018
Taxa named by Gunther Köhler